Məzəm (known as Mazamlı until 2000) is a village in the Qazakh District of Azerbaijan.

References 

Populated places in Qazax District